Syriac Orthodox Patriarch may refer to:

Syriac Orthodox Patriarch of Antioch and All the East
List of Syriac Orthodox Patriarchs of Antioch
Patriarch of Tur Abdin